Ugogoni is an administrative ward in the Kongwa District of the Dodoma Region of Tanzania. In 2016 the Tanzania National Bureau of Statistics report there were 18,528 people in the ward, from 17,048 in 2012.

References

Wards of Dodoma Region